John Gould Stephenson (March 1, 1828 – November 11, 1883) was an American physician and soldier. He was the fifth Librarian of the United States Congress
from 1861 to 1864. He was referred to as the "librarian of the Civil War era" because Stephenson's tenure of librarianship covered almost the entire length of the war.

Biography

Stephenson was born in Lancaster, New Hampshire, to Ruben Stephenson and his wife Mary King Baker. As an adult, he wanted to pursue a medical education. After training at the New Hampshire Medical Institution and Castleton Medical College, he moved to Terre Haute, Indiana, and became active in Republican Party politics. He was among the first faculty members at Vigo Collegiate Institute.

Stephenson was a staunch abolitionist and supported the election of Abraham Lincoln during his failed senatorial campaign against Democrat Stephen A. Douglas in 1858. Two years later, Stephenson delivered speeches in support Lincoln when he ran for president as a Republican. Upon his election, President Lincoln appointed him to the post of Librarian of Congress, replacing John Silva Meehan.  The historical record of the library is unclear as to why the physician sought appointment to this post.

Stephenson spent most of his time serving as a colonel in the Union Army during the Civil War, first with the 19th Indiana Regiment and later with the Army of the Potomac, participating in the Battles of Fitzhugh Crossing, Chancellorsville, and Gettysburg. He distinguished himself by rallying troops and volunteering his services as a general's aide.

His most significant act was appointing Ainsworth Rand Spofford as chief assistant librarian. Spofford would later succeed Stephenson as librarian and was responsible for the transition of the library from a congressional resource to a national institution. During his tenure, the library was forced to house bakeries to make bread for Union troops stationed in the District of Columbia. Stephenson took his complaint directly to President Lincoln and convinced him to remove the bakeries.

Following his resignation in 1864, Stephenson fell into obscurity as he held several political positions, including medical reviewer at the Pension Office.

References

1828 births
1883 deaths
People from Lancaster, New Hampshire
Physicians from Indiana
Librarians of Congress
People of Indiana in the American Civil War
People from Terre Haute, Indiana
Indiana Republicans
Burials at the Congressional Cemetery
American abolitionists